Self-discharge is a phenomenon in batteries in which internal chemical reactions reduce the stored charge of the battery without any connection between the electrodes or any external circuit. Self-discharge decreases the shelf life of batteries and causes them to have less than a full charge when actually put to use.

How fast self-discharge in a battery occurs is dependent on the type of battery, state of charge, charging current, ambient temperature and other factors. Primary batteries are not designed for recharging between manufacturing and use, thus have battery chemistry that has to have a much lower self-discharge rate than older types of secondary cells, but have lost that advantage with the development of rechargeable secondary cells with very low self discharge rates like NiMH cells.

Self-discharge is a chemical reaction, just as closed-circuit discharge is, and tends to occur more quickly at higher temperatures. Storing batteries at lower temperatures thus reduces the rate of self-discharge and preserves the initial energy stored in the battery. Self-discharge is also thought to be reduced as a passivation layer develops on the electrodes over time.

Typical self-discharge by battery type

References

Further reading
 Wu and White, "Self-Discharge Model of a Nickel-Hydrogen Cell." Journal of the Electrochemical Society, 147 (3) 901-909 (2000)

External links
 Battery dischargers Description and treatment of sulphated batteries

Battery (electricity)
Battery charging
Rechargeable batteries